Nyctaginaceae, the four o'clock family, is a family of around 33 genera and 290 species of flowering plants, widely distributed in tropical and subtropical regions, with a few representatives in temperate regions. The family has a unique fruit type, called an "anthocarp", and many genera have extremely large (>100 µm) pollen grains.

The family has been almost universally recognized by plant taxonomists. The APG II system (2003; unchanged from the APG system of 1998), assigns it to the order Caryophyllales in the clade core eudicots.

A phylogenetic study by Levin has justified the combination of Selinocarpus and Ammocodon into the genus Acleisanthes.  The genus Izabalea is now considered a synonym of Agonandra, a genus in Opiliaceae.  A more recent study by Douglas and Manos clarified the relationships among almost all of the genera in the family and demonstrated that a substantial diversification of herbaceous genera has occurred in arid North America.  Many genera of Nyctaginaceae possess unusual characters. Notable examples include sticky bands on the stems between the nodes, cleistogamous flowers (which self-pollinate without opening), or gypsophily, the ability to grow on soils with a high concentration of gypsum.

Genera

The extinct genus Mennegoxylon has been provisionally placed in the family.

Note; as of February 2022, Plants of the World Online classes Boldoa as a synonym of Salpianthus and Grajalesia as a synonym of Pisonia.

Uses
The family contains one food crop, the mauka (Mirabilis extensa), a root vegetable of minor local importance in the Andes. Garden Four-O'Clocks Mirabilis jalapa  species are grown as ornamental plants, as are species of Bougainvillea (Bougainvillea glabra, B. spectabilis, and numerous hybrids), Bougainvillea and Abronia are commonly cultivated in warmer regions.

References

Levin, 2000, Phylogenetic relationships within Nyctaginaceae tribe Nyctagineae: Evidence from nuclear and chloroplast genomes. Systematic Botany 24(4) 738-750.  (Subscription req.)
Douglas, NA and Manos, PS.  2007. Molecular phylogeny of Nyctaginaceae: taxonomy, biogeography, and characters associated with a radiation of xerophytic genera in North America.  American Journal of Botany 94(5) 856-872.

External links

Nyctaginaceae in L. Watson and M. J. Dallwitz (1992 onwards), The families of flowering plants.
Flora of North America: Nyctaginaceae
NCBI Taxonomy Browser
links at CSDL
International Plant Names Index

 
Caryophyllales families